The Second Stage of the 2008 Copa Santander Libertadores was a group stage. It was played from February 12 to April 23.

Format
Twenty-six teams qualified directly into this round, plus six that advanced from the First Stage. This brings the total number of teams in the Second Stage to 32. The teams were drawn into eight groups of four. The teams in each group will play each other in a double round-robin format, playing the other teams in the group once at home and once away. Teams will be awarded 3 points for a win, 1 point for a draw, and 0 points for a loss. The following criteria will be used for breaking ties on points:

Goal difference
Goals scored
Away goals
Draw

The top two teams from each group advance to the Round of 16.

Groups

Group 1

Group 2

Group 3

Group 4

Group 5

Group 6

Group 7

Group 8

Second Stage